The ECCW Vancouver Island Championship is a secondary title in Elite Canadian Championship Wrestling. As its name suggests, the title is defended almost exclusively at ECCW events on Vancouver Island, in cities such as Nanaimo and Victoria. It originally lasted from 1998 until some time after the last champion, Rockford 2000, won the title in 2001, then was reactivated in 2007 when Sid Sylum began claiming the title.  The current champion is Azeem The Dream, who is currently in his second reign as champion.

Title history

See also

Professional wrestling in Canada
Elite Canadian Championship Wrestling
National Wrestling Alliance

References

National Wrestling Alliance championships
Regional professional wrestling championships
Elite Canadian Championship Wrestling championships